Doug Martin (born May 22, 1957) is a former professional American football player who was selected by the Minnesota Vikings in the 1st round (9th overall) of the 1980 NFL Draft. A ,  defensive end from the University of Washington, Martin played in 10 NFL seasons from 1980 to 1989 for the Vikings.

References

1957 births
Living people
People from Fairfield, California
Sportspeople from the San Francisco Bay Area
Players of American football from California
American football defensive ends
Washington Huskies football players
Minnesota Vikings players